NCCU may refer to:

National Chengchi University, a public research university in Taipei, Taiwan
National Cyber Crime Unit, of the National Crime Agency in the United Kingdom
North Carolina Central University, a university in Durham, North Carolina, United States

See also